Evangelos Pateros (born 26 October 1962) is a Greek former water polo player who competed in the 1988 Summer Olympics and in the 1992 Summer Olympics.

References

1962 births
Living people
Greek male water polo players
Greek water polo coaches
Olympiacos Water Polo Club coaches
Olympic water polo players of Greece
Water polo players at the 1988 Summer Olympics
Water polo players at the 1992 Summer Olympics